Rhinoscapha hasterti is a species of true weevil family. It occurs in Papua New Guinea.

References 

 EoL
 Zipcodezoo

hasterti
Entiminae
Beetles described in 1935